David Hibbard is the name of:

 David Hibbard (stage actor) (born 1965), American stage performer
 David Sutherland Hibbard (1868–1966), American missionary and educator